George Briggs, an English convict in Van Diemen's Land, was a sealer in Bass Strait known for siring children on at least one aboriginal woman.

Background 
James Kelly, the circumnavigator of Tasmania, was connected with sealing. He wrote an account of the voyage some time after 1821, in which he says:

Life 
In the course of his narrative, Kelly frequently refers to a sealer of the name of George Briggs, originally from Bedfordshire, England. George Briggs was one of Kelly's shipmen during the circumnavigation. Kelly states that Briggs could speak the language of the North-East Coast tribes fluently. He was an able man, who in 1816 had two native women, one a daughter of the chief Lamanbunganah, and five half-caste children.

One of Briggs's native concubines has been identified as Woretemoeteyenner (–1847), also called Watamutina, Pung, and Bung, a daughter of the North-East chieftain Mannarlargenna who arranged for his daughter to cohabit with Briggs. She bore Briggs five known children, including an infant girl (killed near Launceston in 1811; Aborigines threw the baby into a campfire), and Dolly Dalrymple.

John Briggs 
Brough Smyth gives an account of a half-caste Tasmanian called John Briggs, as follows:

See also 

 Dolly Dalrymple
 James Munro (sealer)

References

Sources 

 Brodie, Nick (28 June 2021). "Forced Entry: The Battle for Aboriginal Land". Forty South, 79. Online ed. Retrieved 20 August 2022.
 McFarlane, Ian (October 2002). "Aboriginal Society in North West Tasmania: Dispossession and Genocide". [Thesis]. The University of Tasmania. pp. 55–56, 65.
 McFarlane, Ian (2005). "Dalrymple, Dolly (1808–1864)". Australian Dictionary of Biography. Supplemental Volume. The Australian National University. Retrieved 20 August 2022.
 Plomley, Brian; Henley, Kristen Anne (1990). "The Sealers of Bass Strait and the Cape Barren Island Community". Tasmanian Historical Research Association Papers and Proceedings, 37(2&3). p. 74.
 Pretyman, E. R. (1967). "Kelly, James (1791–1859)". Australian Dictionary of Biography. Volume 2. The Australian National University. Retrieved 20 August 2022.
 Walter, Maggie (2006). "Woretemoeteyenner". Alexander, Alison (ed.). The Companion to Tasmanian History. Centre for Tasmanian Historical Studies. University of Tasmania. Retrieved 20 August 2022.

Attribution:

Settlers of Tasmania